Pearland Stadium (nicknamed The Rig) is an American multi-use stadium in Pearland, Texas (near Houston). The 12,000-capacity stadium is on the campus of Pearland High School and serves as home to the school's football, soccer, and track and field teams.

In addition, it is home to the Houston Energy, a team in the Independent Women's Football League, who used to play at Houston's Astrodome stadium.

The stadium is nicknamed The Rig after oil rigs as oil is a large part of the Texas economy.

See also

 Architecture of Texas
 List of American football stadiums by capacity
 List of soccer stadiums in the United States

References

External links
 Houston Energy Football
 Texas Football Stadium Database

Educational institutions in the United States with year of establishment missing
Buildings and structures in Brazoria County, Texas
High school football venues in Texas
Multi-purpose stadiums in the United States
Pearland, Texas
Soccer venues in Texas
Athletics (track and field) venues in Texas
2001 establishments in Texas
Sports venues completed in 2001